is a Japanese voice actress and singer from Chiba Prefecture. She is affiliated with Apte Pro. She is best known for her role as Sophie Neuenmuller in the Atelier Sophie series and a few other Atelier series, as well as in a Koei Tecmo crossover game.

Filmography

Anime series
Amagi Brilliant Park (2014), Muse
Gonna be the Twin-Tail!! (2014), Tail Blue
Sakura Trick (2014), Kotone Noda
Jinsei (2014), Nanase
Dragonar Academy (2014), Orletta Blanc
Etotama (2015), Usatan
Castle Town Dandelion (2015), Hana Satō
Chivalry of a Failed Knight (2015), Kagami Kusakabe
Shomin Sample (2015), Kae Tōjō
Active Raid (2016), Hinata Yamabuki
Ange Vierge (2016), Miumi Hinata (eps. 1 – 4, 11 – 12)
The Lost Village (2016), Masaki
Kemono Friends (2017), Silver Fox (ep. 9 – 10, 12)
Minami Kamakura High School Girls Cycling Club (2017), Chika Watanabe
Sagrada Reset (2017), Eri Oka
Recovery of an MMO Junkie (2017), Lilac
Uma Musume Pretty Derby (2018), Narita Brian
Magia Record (2020), Mayu Kozue (Ep.3)
Princess Connect! Re:Dive Season 2 (2022), Ameth

Original net animation 
Sword Gai: The Animation (2018), Sayaka Ogata

Video games
Girls' Frontline (2014) Type88, AR-57
Ange Vierge: The Second Disciplinary Committee Girls Battle (2014), Miumi Hinata
Atelier Sophie: The Alchemist of the Mysterious Book (2015), Sophie Neuenmuller
Princess Connect (2015), Fio, Nebbia
Idol Connect: Asterisk*Live! (2016), Yui Sezuki
 Warriors All-Stars (2017) Sophie Neuenmuller
 Magia Record (2018), Mayu Kozue
 Princess Connect! Re:Dive (2018), Ameth, Nebbia
 World Flipper (2020), Stella
 Gate of Nightmares (2022), Kirara
 Atelier Sophie 2: The Alchemist of the Mysterious Dream (2022), Sophie Neuenmuller
 D4DJ (2022), Sophia

Discography

Singles

References

External links
 
 Yūka Aisaka Profile at Apte Pro

Japanese voice actresses
Living people
Voice actresses from Chiba Prefecture
1990 births
Musicians from Chiba Prefecture